Changchun East railway station is a railway station of Changchun–Tumen Railway. The station located in the Erdao District of Changchun, Jilin province, China.

References

Railway stations in Jilin
Railway stations in Changchun